Eslamabad-e Bagh-e Nar (also Romanized as Eslāmābād-e Bāgh-e Nār; also known as Eslāmābād) is a village in Emamzadeh Jafar Rural District, in the Central District of Gachsaran County, Kohgiluyeh and Boyer-Ahmad Province, Iran. At the 2006 census, its population was 273, in 55 families.

References 

Populated places in Gachsaran County